Isca Kam (born ) is a Nauruan male weightlifter, competing in the +105 kg category and representing Nauru at international competitions. He competed at world championships, most recently at the 1998 World Weightlifting Championships.

Major results

References

1980 births
Living people
Nauruan male weightlifters
Place of birth missing (living people)
Weightlifters at the 1998 Commonwealth Games
Commonwealth Games competitors for Nauru